Is Chand Pe Dagh Nahin is a Pakistani drama television series directed by Aamir Yousuf and written by Nooran Makhdoom. It first aired on A-Plus TV on 11 July 2017 as a part of night programming. The series features Zarnish Khan and Kamran Jillani in leading roles along with Saba Faisal, Firdous Jamal, Kashif Mehmood and Aamna Malick in supporting roles. The series is set in rural areas Karachi and Punjab.

Cast 

 Zarnish Khan as Mahnuma
 Kamran Jillani as Abdul Wahid Chaudhry
 Aamna Malick as Mahrukh
 Saba Faisal as Mehnaz
 Firdous Jamal
 Nirvaan Nadeem as Sajid
 Kashif Mehmood as Ghaybat
 Afshan Qureshi as Mahrukh's mother
 Wajeeha Ali Khan as Nazneen
 Sonia Nazir as Mehreen
 Aisha Khan as Ghaybat's mother
 Arsalan Idress as Abdul Ahad Chaudhry

Soundtrack 
The official soundtrack of the series was performed by Asrar along with Hina Nasrullah on the lyrics of Asim Raza while music composition was done by Sahir Ali Bagga.

References 

Pakistani drama television series